Luis Miguel: The Series (Spanish: Luis Miguel: La serie)  is a Spanish-language American biographical television series produced by Gato Grande Productions along to MGM Television for Netflix and Telemundo. It is an authorized version on the life of the Mexican singer Luis Miguel. It stars Diego Boneta as the titular character. Filming began on November 16, 2017.

On 22 April 2018, Karla Gonzales, series showrunner, confirmed that the show has been renewed for a second season. On 7 January 2020, it was confirmed that the shooting of the second season would begin in February 2020 and that the season is scheduled to be released in the same year. However, in April 2020, the shooting of the second season was put on hold due to the COVID-19 pandemic and on May 21, 2020, it was announced that the season would be released on April 18, 2021. On May 30, 2021, it was announced that the series was renewed for a third and final season, which premiered on October 28, 2021.

Plot 
Before being known as Luis Miguel, Micky, as his family called him, finds a great satisfaction, love, and security alongside his beloved mother Marcela (Anna Favella) and his younger brother Alex (Juanpa Zurita). A singer of natural talent, he begins gaining recognition and popularity until he turns 11, when his father, Luis Rey (Óscar Jaenada), obsessively gives himself the task of turning his son into the superstar that he himself did not manage to be. As Micky grows and becomes a pop star of the time, with the name of Luis Miguel (Diego Boneta), problems associated with fame and protecting his private life and his great loves begin. While the world falls in love with the masculine image of a tanned young man with a beautiful smile and fascinating lifestyle in Acapulco, which was the hallmark of his career, what lies behind this reality is how fame and fortune can impact a family.

Cast and characters 
Legend
 = Main cast (credited)
 = Recurring cast (2+)
 = Guest cast (1)

Main 
 Diego Boneta as Luis Miguel
 Izan Llunas as Child Luis Miguel (season 1)
 Luis de la Rosa as Young Luis Miguel (season 1; guest season 3)
 Óscar Jaenada as Luis Rey (seasons 1, 3)
 Camila Sodi as Erika, based on Issabela Camil (seasons 1–2)
 Martín Bello as Tito (season 1; guest season 2)
 Anna Favella as Marcela Basteri (seasons 1, 3)
 César Bordón as Hugo López (seasons 1–2; guest season 3)
 Juanpa Zurita as Alex Basteri
 Paulina Dávila as Mariana Yazbek (season 1)
 Vanessa Bauche as Rosy Esquivel (season 1)
 Macarena Achaga as Michelle Salas (seasons 2–3)
 Fernando Guallar as Mauricio Ambrosi (seasons 2–3)
 Pablo Cruz as Patricio Robles (seasons 2–3)
 Teresa Ruiz as Azucena (season 3; recurring season 2)
 Juan Ignacio Cané as José Pérez (season 3; recurring season 2)
 Jade Ewen as Mariah Carey (season 3)
 Sebastián Zurita as Adult Alex Basteri (season 3)

Recurring and guest 
 Alfonso Borbolla as Raúl Velasco (season 1)
 León Peraza as Andrés García (season 1)
 Alberto Caneva as Sergio Basteri (season 1)
 Sergio Lanza as Juan Carlos Calderón
  César Santa Ana as Alex McCluskey (seasons 1–2; guest season 3) 
 Javier Gómez as Jaime Camil Garza (season 1; guest season 2)
 Lola Casamayor as Matilde Sánchez Repiso (season 2; guest season 1)
 Vicente Tamayo as Bobby, based on Roberto Palazuelos (season 1)
 Alexis Ortega as Burro, based on Jorge van Rankin (season 1)
 Kevin Holt as Miguel Alemán Magnani
 Gabriel Nuncio as El Doc
 Pilar Santacruz as Sophie, based on Stephanie Salas (season 2; guest season 1)
 Andrés Almeida as Armando Serna
 Arturo Barba as El Tigre Azcárraga, based on Emilio Azcárraga Milmo (season 1)
 Mario Zaragoza as General Durazo, based on Arturo Durazo Moreno (season 1)
 Hugo Catalán as Moro, based on Alejandro González Iñárritu
 Albi De Abreu as Miguel Ángel Villegas
 Isabel Burr as Adela Noriega (season 1)
 Marcela Guirado as Verónica Castro
 Sofía Castro as Alina
 Karla Carrillo as Conductora MTV
 Aurora Gil (season 1) and Rocío Verdejo (season 2) as Cynthia Casas
 Viridiana Olvera as Pati Chapoy
 Pierre David as Armando Manzanero
 Daniel Cubillo as Bebu Silvetti
Fatima Molina as Paola Moreno (season 2)
 Amparo Barcia as Sasha Sökol
 Valery Sais as young Michelle (season 2)
 Axel Llunas as young Sergio Basteri
 Guy Pennacchio as Frank Sinatra (Season 2)
 Ximena Ayala as Adriana (Season 1)
 Mariela Garriga as Daysi Fuentes

Cameo appearances 
 Luis Miguel as Himself
 Jorge van Rankin as Himself
 Toño Mauri as Himself
 Alejandro Basteri as Himself
 Michael Ronda as Diego Boneta

Broadcast history 
On 9 April 2018, Telemundo published through its website Now Telemundo a preview of the first episode entitled "Primera Mirada". The first episode of the series premiered on 12 April 2018 during an exclusive screening held in Beverly Hills, California, as part of the presentation of the series, Its official premiere was on 22 April 2018 on Telemundo at 9pm/8c, and in Spain and Latin America on Netflix after its broadcast on television, each episode is broadcast every Sunday.

Television ratings 
 
}}

Episodes

Season 1 (2018)

Season 2 (2021)

Season 3 (2021)

Notes

Awards and nominations

Music 

The first soundtrack of the series, titled Luis Miguel La Serie Soundtrack, was released on 22 April 2018.

Track listing 

The soundtrack of the series only contains 21 songs available on Spotify. There are some songs that are not shown in the album and are listed below:

 "Soy Como Quiero Ser" performed by Izan Llunas
 "Eres" performed by Izan Llunas

Charts

Weekly charts

Year-end charts

Certifications

References

External links 
 
 

2010s American drama television series
Spanish-language Netflix original programming
Telemundo original programming
2018 American television series debuts
Television series based on actual events
Television series based on singers and musicians
2018 soundtrack albums
Luis Miguel
Television productions suspended due to the COVID-19 pandemic
Biographical films about singers